Gliese 588 is a nearby red dwarf star of spectral type M2.5, located in the constellation Lupus at 19.34 light-years from Earth. It emits a very stable light flux, with no detectable pulsations.

History of observations
According to Luyten's (1979) (catalogue LHS, as well as NLTT), this object was discovered by Innes. In 1903–1927 Innes was the director of the Union Observatory (UO), South Africa.

However, in the Ci 20 catalogue (see number 934) this star was designated as "CD -40 7021", not "UO". This may indicate that GJ 588 was first catalogued earlier, in the Cordoba Durchmusterung by John M. Thome in 1894. Note: the real CD designation of Gliese 588 is "CD-40 9712", not "CD -40 7021": GJ 588 has a RA of 15 hours, but the real CD -40 7021 has a RA of 11 hours.

Planetary system

On 11 June 2019, two planets were detected by radial velocity around Gliese 588 among other 118 planets around M dwarf stars.

References

Lupus (constellation)
M-type main-sequence stars
0588
J15321302-4116314
076074
CD-40 9712
Hypothetical planetary systems